Meppel is a railway station in Meppel, Netherlands. The station opened on 1 October 1867 and is on the Arnhem–Leeuwarden railway and Meppel–Groningen railway. Train services are operated by Nederlandse Spoorwegen.

History
The building was constructed in 1867 according to a standardised layout by the State Railways, namely the revised "third class". The classical design probably comes from Karel Hendrik van Brederode, who also designed several other models for the State Railways.

Meppel station was renovated in 1982, which mainly involved the station's interior. It became a national heritage site on 28 January 1998.

Train services

Bus services

See also
 List of railway stations in Drenthe

References

External links
NS website
Public Transport journey planner

Railway stations in Drenthe
Railway stations opened in 1867
Railway stations on the Staatslijn A
Railway stations on the Staatslijn C
Meppel